Unplugged is a live album by American hip hop group Arrested Development. Performing live at the Ed Sullivan Theater in New York City on December 17, 1992, their performance was recorded for the MTV Unplugged television series.

Track listing

Personnel 
Nadirah Ali – vocals
Michael Alvord – mixing assistant, assistant
Arnaé – vocals
Kundalini Mark Batson – piano, director, co-music director
Michael Benabib – photography
Kevin Carnes – vocals
Freddie Cash – bass
Alex Coletti – producer
Rasha Don – drums
Montsho Eshe – vocals, dancer, choreographer
Fulani Hart – vocals
Headliner – turntables
Audrey Johns – liner note producer
Ju Ju House – drums
Terrance Cinque Mason – vocals
Frank Micelotta – photography
Baba Oje – spiritual advisor
Kevin Parker – mixing assistant, assistant
Naomi Patton – liner notes
David Pleasant – harmonica, percussion
Don Rasa – drums
Brandon Ross – guitar
Kelli Sae – vocals
Speech – director, vocals, mixing, co-music director
Alvin Speights – engineer, mixing
Joel Stillerman – executive producer
Aerle Taree – vocals, stylist
Atiba Wilson – flute, percussion

Charts

References 

Arrested Development (group) albums
1993 live albums
Chrysalis Records live albums
MTV Unplugged albums